Keran is a village in Kupwara district, Jammu and Kashmir, India. It is on the bank of the Kishanganga River.  The village lies on the Line of Control. The Keran block includes three villages: Keran, Mundiyan and Pathran.

The adjacent habitation on the Pakistani side across the boundary is also called Keran. The Kishanganga river flowing through village acts as the natural border between the two habitations. While both sides have the same predominant religion, social and cultural practices differ greatly. The people are not allowed by Indian and Pakistani officials to intermingle. Keran village is surrounded by dense forests. Shalabhatu, a village in Keran sector is divided between Jammu and Kashmir and Pakistan administration Kashmir. It was among the foremost infiltration routes used in the early 1990s by militants. The village has three border posts — Khokhri, Kulari and Mangerta.

History 
The village is said to have been established by Raja Karn in the tenth century. In 1990, the Indian army relocated the villagers due to frequent firing and shelling by the Pakistan Army. In 1992, a flood swept over the cultivated land and houses. In 2013, armed militants infiltrated the village, but were killed by the Indian Army during a 15-day operation.

See also
 Teetwal

References

Villages in Kupwara district